Dude - Water Winner is a 1991 Soviet crime film directed by Arkadiy Tigay.

Plot 
The film tells about the engineer Gorelikov, who, together with his disabled friend, opens a salon with computers for children and students. And suddenly they are attacked by a gang of racketeers.

Cast 
 Sergey Kuryokhin as Pavel Gorelikov
 Larisa Borodina as Valentina
 Andrey Ponomaryov as Kostya
 Vladimir Eryomin as Mobster
 Aleksandr Glazun as Mobster
 Valentin Zhilyayev as Mafia boss
 Andrey Krasko as Mobster
 Viktor Tregubovich as Co-operator
 Gabriel Vorobyov as Lover of mafia boss
 Igor Yakovlev as «Popik», mobster

References

External links 
 

1991 films
1990s Russian-language films
Soviet crime films
1990s crime films